Sterling may refer to:

Common meanings 
 Sterling silver, a grade of silver
 Sterling (currency), the currency of the United Kingdom
 Pound sterling, the primary unit of that currency

Places

United Kingdom 
 Stirling, a Scottish city whose alternative historical spelling is Sterling

United States 
 Sterling, Alaska
 Sterling, Colorado
 Sterling Micropolitan Statistical Area, Colorado
 Sterling, Connecticut
 Sterling, Georgia
 Sterling, in Bingham County, Idaho
 Sterling Wildlife Management Area, Idaho
 Sterling, Illinois
 Sterling, a ghost town in Jackson County, Iowa
 Sterling, Kansas
 Sterling, Massachusetts
 Sterling, Michigan
 Sterling Heights, Michigan
 Sterling State Park, Michigan
 Sterling Center, Minnesota
 Sterling, Missouri
 Sterling, in Madison County, Montana
 Sterling, Nebraska
 Sterling, New York
 Sterling, in Mecklenburg County, North Carolina
 Mount Sterling (Great Smoky Mountains), North Carolina
 Sterling, North Dakota
 Sterling, Ohio 
 Sterling, Oklahoma
 Sterling, in Woodward Township, Clearfield County, Pennsylvania
 Sterling City, Texas
 Sterling County, Texas
 Sterling, Utah
 Sterling, Virginia
 Sterling, Washington
 Sterling, Polk County, Wisconsin
 Sterling, Vernon County, Wisconsin
 Sterling Township (disambiguation)

Businesses 
 Sterling Airlines, a former low-cost Danish airline
 Sterling Armaments Company, based near London, England
 Sterling Bank (Nigeria), a national commercial bank
 Sterling Bicycle Co., a 19th-century American bicycle manufacturer
 Sterling (cigarette), a British cigarette brand
 Sterling Commerce, a former software company
 Sterling Drug (a.k.a. Sterling Products, Inc.), a pharmaceutical company now owned by Bayer
 Sterling Furniture, Scotland's largest furniture retail outlet
 Sterling Jewelers, the largest retail jewelry company in the United States
 Sterling (marque), a British automobile brand, sold in the U.S. from 1987 to 1991
 Sterling Optical
 Sterling Plumbing, a brand of products from Kohler Co.
 Sterling Publishing, a publisher of nonfiction books
 Sterling Software, a (now defunct) company co-founded by Sterling Williams
 Sterling Sports Cars, an American automobile kit company
 Sterling Trucks, a former commercial truck brand in the United States
 Hotel Sterling, a former hotel in Wilkes-Barre, Pennsylvania, United States

Schools 
 Sterling College (Kansas), Sterling, Kansas
 Sterling College (Vermont), Craftsbury Common, Vermont
 Sterling High School (disambiguation)

Music 
 Sterling Records (Sweden), a classical music record label
 Sterling Records (US), noted for being the first to sign Hank Williams
 Music Man Sterling, a bass guitar by Music Man

People 
 Sterling (given name)
 Sterling (surname)
 Sterling Golden, early ring name of American professional wrestler Hulk Hogan (born 1953)

Fictional characters
 Sterling Archer, eponymous protagonist of the animated TV series Archer
 Bruce Sterling (Love of Life), American television soap opera character (1959 to 1980)
 Bruce Sterling, protagonist of the 2003 TV series Mister Sterling
 Roger Sterling, on the TV series Mad Men

Other uses 
 Sterling (horse) (1868–1891), a British racehorse and sire
 Sterling (program), a program for generating fractals
 Sterling Plaza, a historic building in Beverly Hills, California
 Sterling submachine gun, produced by the Sterling Armaments Company
 a scuppernong (large muscadine grape, Vitis rotundifolia) cultivar

See also
 Sterling Forest State Park, New York
 Mount Sterling (disambiguation)
 Stirling (disambiguation)